Homer  is a 1970 Canadian-American drama film directed by John Trent and starring Don Scardino, Tisa Farrow and Alex Nicol.

The film was entered in competition at the 22nd Canadian Film Awards in 1970, although its inclusion was controversial; it was shot in Canada with a Canadian director, but financed by an American studio and told a story set in the United States, resulting in some debate about whether the film was sufficiently Canadian.

Plot 
A high school graduate, named Homer, experiences the pains of the generation gap and the Vietnam War in the late 1960s while growing up in Schomberg, Wisconsin.

Cast 
 Don Scardino as Homer Edwards  
 Tisa Farrow as Laurie Grainger 
 Alex Nicol as Mr. Harry Edwards 
 Lenka Peterson as Mrs. Edwards
 Tim Henry as Eddie Cochran
 Tom Harvey as Mr. Jess Tibbet
 Jan Campbell as Mrs. Grainger
 Arch McDonnell as Mr. Grainger
 Ralph Endersby as Hector
 Murray Westgate as Mr. Cochran
 Mona O'Hearn as Mrs. Cochran
 Bob Warner as Sheriff
 Trudy Young as Sally
 Allen Doremus as Minister

Filming locations
 Schomberg, Ontario
 Unionville, Ontario
 Palgrave, Ontario

See also
 List of American films of 1970

References

External links

American drama films
Canadian drama films
Cinema Center Films films
1970 drama films
1970 films
English-language Canadian films
Films set in Wisconsin
Films directed by John Trent (director)
1970s English-language films
Films shot in Ontario
1970s American films
1970s Canadian films